William Westcott Boddington (November 22, 1910 – November 15, 1996) was an American field hockey player who competed in the 1932 Summer Olympics and 1936 Summer Olympics.

In 1932 he was a member of the American field hockey team, which won the bronze medal. He played two matches as forward.  His goal for the United States in the 1932 match against India was the first goal given up by India in six Olympic competitions. Four years later he was a member of the American field hockey team, which lost all three matches in the preliminary round in the 1936 Summer Olympics in Berlin, Germany and did not advance. He played three matches as forward. Adolf Hitler signed his visa. Following World War II, Boddington continued his love of sports by coaching soccer at Colorado College. In 1990, he was recognized as the "Father" of Colorado College soccer. In 1995, he was among the first group of athletes to be inducted into the Colorado College Athletic Hall of Fame.

He was born in Jersey City, New Jersey and died in Colorado Springs, Colorado after having built a successful career in the lumber industry. He died on November 15, 1996, and he is survived by his sons, John and Tim. Boddington served in the United States Army from 1941 to 1945. He joined the 10th Mountain Division in 1942 and remained with the Division until 1945. During the Division's training at Camp Hale, Colorado, he commanded A of the 86th Regiment. The United States Army awarded him the Bronze Star for his valor while serving with the 10th Mountain Division in the Italian Campaign.

Boddington's passion for the 10th Mountain Division continued throughout his life. As one of the founders of the Tenth Mountain Division Foundation, he served as President and President Emeritus. He also dedicated time to community service. He was trustee of the Colorado Springs School and a trustee of the Colorado Springs School Foundation. He also served as a Trustee of the 10th Mountain Division Trail Hut System. He served on the board of the Colorado Opera Festival and was an early founder of the SOXY program in Colorado Springs. In 1987, he was the honoree of the Mountain States Retail Lumber Association, of which only 14 other men have received a Life Membership by this Association.

External links
 
William Boddington's profile at databaseOlympics.com
William Boddington's profile at Sports Reference.com

1910 births
1996 deaths
Sportspeople from Jersey City, New Jersey
United States Army personnel of World War II
American male field hockey players
Field hockey players at the 1932 Summer Olympics
Field hockey players at the 1936 Summer Olympics
Olympic bronze medalists for the United States in field hockey
Colorado College people
College men's soccer coaches in the United States
Medalists at the 1932 Summer Olympics
American soccer coaches